The Canon EOS C200 is a digital cinema camera in the Cinema EOS range. It was announced by Canon on May 31, 2017. It is available in two options: as the production-ready C200 with an EVF, LCD monitor, handle and handgrip accessories; or as the standalone camera body C200B.

The EOS C200 records RAW in Canon's proprietary Cinema RAW Light video format — which is approximately 1/3 to 1/5 the file size of their standard RAW format. Editing and grading of Canon's Cinema RAW Light video format is supported in Adobe Premiere Pro CC 2018, DaVinci Resolve, and Assimilate Scratch v9.

Specifications 
 8.85MP 4096x2160 Super 35 CMOS Sensor
 Dual DIGIC DV 6 Processors
 RAW Light 12 bit, 10 bit
 4K DCI and UHD, 1920 x 1080
 120p, 59.94p, 50p, 29.97p, 25p, 24p, 23.98p
 Canon Cinema RAW Light Codec
 Integrated EVF, 2 x XLR Audio Inputs
 Rotating 4" LCD Monitor, Camera Grip
 Timecode out only
 1 x CFast card, 2 x SD card slots
 Dual Pixel CMOS AF Technology
 Price (USD): $7,499 (C200); $5,999 (C200B)

References 

C200
Digital movie cameras